Govindapura may refer to:

 Govindpura, Pakistan, a village
 Govindpura, Bhopal, an urban locality in India
 Govindpura Assembly constituency

See also 
 Govindapura (disambiguation)